Pink is a novel written by filmmaker Gus Van Sant. It was published in 1997 on the Nan Talese imprint of Doubleday.

Summary
The story is set in Saquatch, Oregon, United States, and details the life of Spunky Davis, a middle-aged maker of infomercials who is trying to find his next assignment and finish the science-fiction screenplay that he hopes will bring him Hollywood glory. The science-fiction screenplay sections of the book were written by Lanny Quarles. Spunky meets Jack and Matt who are from another dimension called Pink. The book has a flip-book element and other drawings that were created by Van Sant himself.

References

External links
 .

1997 American novels
American philosophical novels
Absurdist fiction
American novellas
Novels set in Oregon
Nan A. Talese books